The 2018 North Indian Ocean cyclone season was an above-average period of tropical cyclone formation in the Northern Indian Ocean. The season featured 14 depressions, 10 deep depressions, 7 cyclonic storms, 5 severe cyclonic storms, 4 very severe cyclonic storms, and 1 extremely severe cyclonic storm. The season has no official boundaries, though storms typically form between April and December, with peaks in tropical cyclone activity from May–June and in November.

The India Meteorological Department (IMD) is the official Regional Specialized Meteorological Centre for the Northern Indian Ocean basin, and as such, it is responsible for tracking and issuing advisories on systems in the Arabian Sea and in the Bay of Bengal. The Joint Typhoon Warning Center (JTWC) unofficially issues advisories on systems in the Northern Indian Ocean, assigning tropical cyclones a numerical identifier and suffixing it with the letter A for systems in the Arabian Sra and B for systems in the Bay of Bengal. The IMD measures tropical cyclone wind speeds over a 3-minute average while the JTWC uses a 1-minute average.

Timeline

March
March 13
03:00 UTC at  the IMD upgrades a well-marked low-pressure area in the Arabian Sea to a depression, estimating maximum 3-minute sustained winds of 45 km/h (30 mph) and a minimum central pressure of 1006 hPa (mbar; 29.71 inHg).
March 15
00:00 UTC the IMD downgrades the depression to a well-marked low over Lakshadweep.

May
May 16
00:00 UTC at  the JTWC upgrades a disturbance to a tropical depression, assigning it the designation 01A.
12:00 UTC at  the IMD upgrades 01A to a depression.
18:00 UTC at  the JTWC upgrades 01A to a tropical storm.
May 17
00:00 UTC at  the IMD upgrades 01A to a deep depression.
03:00 UTC at  the IMD upgrades 01A to a cyclonic storm, assigning it the name Sagar.
May 18
03:00 UTC at  the IMD estimates Sagar to have peaked in intensity with maximum 3-minute sustained winds of 85 km/h (50 mph) and a minimum central pressure of 994 hPa (mbar; 29.35 inHg).
18:00 UTC at  the JTWC upgrades Sagar to a Category 1-equivalent cyclone on the Saffir–Simpson scale, estimating maximum 1-minute sustained winds of 120 km/h (75 mph).
May 19
00:00 UTC at  the JTWC downgrades Sagar to a tropical storm.
between 08:00 and 09:00 UTC at  Sagar makes landfall on Somalia.
18:00 UTC at  the IMD downgrades Sagar to a deep depression.
May 20
00:00 UTC at  the IMD downgrades Sagar to a depression.
03:00 UTC the IMD downgrades Sagar to a well-marked low.
06:00 UTC at  the JTWC downgrades Sagar to a tropical depression.
May 21
06:00 UTC at  the JTWC begins monitoring a tropical depression in the Arabian Sea, assigning it the designation 02A.
12:00 UTC at  the IMD upgrades 02A to a depression.
May 22
00:00 UTC at  the JTWC upgrades 02A to a tropical storm.
03:00 UTC at  the IMD upgrades 02A to a deep depression.
12:00 UTC at  the IMD upgrades 02A to a cyclonic storm, assigning it the name Mekunu.
May 23
03:00 UTC at  the IMD upgrades Mekunu to a severe cyclonic storm.
09:00 UTC at  the IMD upgrades Mekunu to a very severe cyclonic storm.
12:00 UTC at  the JTWC upgrades Mekunu to a Category 1-equivalent cyclone on the Saffir–Simpson scale.
May 25
00:00 UTC at  the JTWC upgrades Mekunu to a Category 2-equivalent cyclone on the Saffir–Simpson scale.
03:00 UTC at  the IMD upgrades Mekunu to an extremely severe cyclonic storm.
12:00 UTC at  the IMD estimates Mekunu to have peaked in intensity with maximum 3-minute sustained winds of 175 km/h (110 mph) and a minimum central pressure of 960 hPa (mbar; 28.35 inHg).
12:00 UTC at  the JTWC upgrades Mekunu to a Category 3-equivalent cyclone on the Saffir–Simpson scale, estimating maximum 1-minute sustained winds of 185 km/h (115 mph).
between 18:30 and 19:30 UTC at  Mekunu makes landfall on Oman.
May 26
00:00 UTC at  the IMD downgrades Mekunu to a very severe cyclonic storm.
00:00 UTC at  the JTWC downgrades Mekunu to a Category 2-equivalent cyclone on the Saffir–Simpson scale.
03:00 UTC at  the IMD downgrades Mekunu to a severe cyclonic storm.
06:00 UTC at  the JTWC downgrades Mekunu to a Category 1-equivalent cyclone on the Saffir–Simpson scale.
09:00 UTC at  the IMD downgrades Mekunu to a cyclonic storm.
12:00 UTC at  the JTWC downgrades Mekunu to a tropical storm.
18:00 UTC at  the IMD downgrades Mekunu to a deep depression.
May 27
00:00 UTC at  the IMD downgrades Mekunu to a depression.
03:00 UTC the IMD downgrades Mekunu to a well-marked low.
06:00 UTC at  the JTWC downgrades Mekunu to a tropical depression.
May 28
06:00 UTC at  the JTWC upgrades a disturbance in the Bay of Bengal to a tropical depression, assigning it the designation 03B.
18:00 UTC at  the JTWC downgrades 03B to a tropical wave.
May 29
00:00 UTC at  the JTWC upgrades 03B to a tropical storm.
06:00 UTC at  the IMD upgrades 03B to a depression.
12:00 UTC at  the IMD estimates 03B to have peaked in intensity with maximum 3-minute sustained winds of 55 km/h (35 mph) and a minimum central pressure of 992 hPa (mbar; 29.29 inHg).
12:00 UTC at  the JTWC estimates 03B to have peaked in intensity with maximum 1-minute sustained winds of 85 km/h (50 mph).
between 17:00 and 18:00 UTC 03B makes landfall north of Kyaukphyu.
18:00 UTC at  the IMD upgrades 03B to a deep depression.
May 30
00:00 UTC at  the JTWC downgrades 03B to a tropical depression.
03:00 UTC at  the IMD downgrades 03B to a depression.
06:00 UTC the IMD downgrades 03B to a well-marked low.

June
June 10
06:00 UTC at  the IMD upgrades a well-marked low in the Bay of Bengal to a depression.
12:00 UTC at  the IMD estimates the depression to have peaked in intensity with maximum 3-minute sustained winds of 45 km/h (30 mph) and a minimum central pressure of 988 hPa (mbar; 29.18 inHg).
15:00 UTC at  the depression makes landfall on Feni.
June 11
00:00 UTC the IMD downgrades the depression to a well-marked low.

July
July 21
03:00 UTC at  the IMD upgrades a well-marked low in the Bay of Bengal to a depression.
09:00 UTC at  the IMD upgrades the system to a deep depression, estimating maximum 3-minute sustained winds of 55 km/h (35 mph) and a minimum central pressure of 988 hPa (mbar; 29.18 inHg).
between 11:00 and 12:00 UTC the system makes landfall south of Digha.
18:00 UTC at  the IMD downgrades the system to a depression.
July 23
00:00 UTC the IMD downgrades the system to a well-marked low.

August
August 7
09:00 UTC at  the IMD upgrades a well-marked low in the Bay of Bengal to a depression, estimating maximum 3-minute sustained winds of 45 km/h (30 mph) and a minimum central pressure of 992 Hpa (mbar; 29.29 inHg).
between 14:30 and 16:30 UTC the depression makes landfall close to Balasore.
August 8
03:00 UTC the IMD downgrades the depression to a well-marked low.
August 15
03:00 UTC at  the IMD upgrades a well-marked low in the Bay of Bengal to a depression, estimating maximum sustained 3-minute winds of 45 km/h (30 mph) and a minimum central pressure of 993 Hpa (mbar; 29.32 inHg).
August 17
03:00 UTC the IMD downgrades the depression to a well-marked low.

September
September 6
00:00 UTC at  the IMD upgrades a well-marked low in the Bay of Bengal to a depression.
03:00 UTC at  the IMD upgrades the system to a deep depression, estimating maximum 3-minute sustained winds of 55 km/h (35 mph).
between 04:30 and 05:30 UTC the system makes landfall close to Digha.
September 7
00:00 UTC at  the IMD downgrades the system to a depression.
06:00 UTC the IMD downgrades the system to a well-marked low.
September 19
15:00 UTC at  the IMD upgrades a well-marked low in the Bay of Bengal to a depression.
18:00 UTC at  the JTWC upgrades the system to a tropical depression, assigning it the designation 04B and estimating maximum 1-minute sustained winds of 65 km/h (40 mph).
September 20
03:00 UTC at  the IMD upgrades 04B to a deep depression.
12:00 UTC at  the JTWC upgrades 04B to a tropical storm.
15:00 UTC at  the IMD upgrades 04B to a cyclonic storm, assigning it the name Daye and estimating maximum 3-minute sustained winds of 65 km/h (40 mph) and a minimum central pressure of 992 Hpa (mbar; 29.29 inHg).
between 19:00 and 20:00 UTC at  Daye makes landfall on Gopalpur.
September 21
00:00 UTC at  the IMD downgrades Daye to a deep depression.
06:00 UTC at  the JTWC downgrades Daye to a tropical depression.
12:00 UTC at  the IMD downgrades Daye to a depression.
September 22
12:00 UTC the IMD downgrades Daye to a well-marked low.

October
October 6
06:00 UTC at  the JTWC upgrades a disturbance in the Arabian Sea to a tropical depression, assigning it the designation 04A.
09:00 UTC at  the IMD upgrades 05A to a depression.
October 7
09:00 UTC at  the IMD upgrades 05A to a deep depression.
18:00 UTC at  the JTWC upgrades 05A to a tropical storm.
October 8
00:00 UTC at  the IMD upgrades 05A to a cyclonic storm, assigning it the name Luban.
03:00 UTC at  the IMD upgrades a well-marked low in the Bay of Bengal to a depression.
06:00 UTC at  the JTWC upgrades the system to a tropical depression, assigning it the designation 06B.
18:00 UTC at  the IMD upgrades 06B to a deep depression.
October 9
00:00 UTC at  the JTWC upgrades 06B to a tropical storm.
06:00 UTC at  the IMD upgrades 06B to a cyclonic storm, assigning it the name Titli.
09:00 UTC at  the IMD upgrades Luban to a severe cyclonic storm.
18:00 UTC at  the JTWC upgrades Luban to a Category 1-equivalent cyclone on the Saffir–Simpson scale.
21:00 UTC at  the IMD upgrades Titli to a severe cyclonic storm.
October 10
00:00 UTC at  the IMD upgrades Luban to a very severe cyclonic storm.
00:00 UTC at  the JTWC upgrades Titli to a Category 1-equivalent cyclone on the Saffir–Simpson scale.
06:00 UTC at  the IMD estimates Luban to have peaked in intensity with maximum 3-minute sustained winds of 140 km/h (85 mph) and a minimum central pressure of 978 hPa (mbar; 28.88 inHg).
06:00 UTC at  the IMD upgrades Titli to a very severe cyclonic storm.
12:00 UTC at  the JTWC upgrades Luban to a Category 2-equivalent cyclone on the Saffir–Simpson scale, estimating maximum 1-minute sustained winds of 155 km/h (100 mph).
12:00 UTC at  the IMD estimates Titli to have peaked in intensity with maximum 3-minute sustained winds of 150 km/h (90 mph) and a minimum central pressure of 970 hPa (mbar; 28.64 inHg).
12:00 UTC at  the JTWC upgrades Titli to a Category 2-equivalent cyclone on the Saffir–Simpson scale.
18:00 UTC at  the JTWC upgrades Titli to a Category 3-equivalent cyclone on the Saffir–Simpson scale, estimating maximum 1-minute sustained winds of 195 km/h (120 mph).
between 23:00 UTC and 00:00 UTC October 11 at  Titli makes landfall on Andhra Pradesh.
October 11
00:00 UTC at  the JTWC downgrades Luban to a Category 1-equivalent cyclone on the Saffir–Simpson scale.
06:00 UTC at  the IMD downgrades Titli to a severe cyclonic storm.
06:00 UTC at  the JTWC downgrades Titli to a Category 1-equivalent cyclone on the Saffir–Simpson scale.
12:00 UTC at  the JTWC downgrades Luban to a tropical storm.
12:00 UTC at  the IMD downgrades Titli to a cyclonic storm.
18:00 UTC at  the IMD downgrades Titli to a deep depression.
18:00 UTC at  the JTWC downgrades Titli to a tropical storm.
October 12
03:00 UTC at  the IMD downgrades Luban to a severe cyclonic storm.
06:00 UTC at  the JTWC downgrades Titli to a tropical depression.
09:00 UTC at  the IMD downgrades Titli to a depression.
18:00 UTC at  the IMD downgrades Luban to a cyclonic storm.
October 13
00:00 UTC at  the IMD downgrades Titli to a well-marked low.
October 14
between 05:30 and 06:00 UTC at  Luban makes landfall on Oman.
09:00 UTC at  the IMD downgrades Luban to a deep depression.
12:00 UTC at  the JTWC downgrades Luban to a tropical depression.
18:00 UTC at  the IMD downgrades Luban to a depression.
October 15
03:00 UTC the IMD downgrades Luban to a well-marked low.

November
November 10
03:00 UTC at  the IMD upgrades a well-marked low in the Bay of Bengal to a depression.
12:00 UTC at  the IMD upgrades the system to a deep depression.
18:00 UTC at  the JTWC upgrades the system to a tropical storm, assigning it the designation 07B.
November 11
00:00 UTC at  the IMD upgrades 07B to a cyclonic storm, assigning it the name Gaja.
November 12
12:00 UTC at  the JTWC downgrades Gaja to a tropical depression.
November 13
18:00 UTC at  the JTWC upgrades Gaja to a tropical storm.
November 15
03:00 UTC at  the IMD upgrades Gaja to a severe cyclonic storm.
06:00 UTC at  the JTWC upgrades Gaja to a Category 1-equivalent cyclone on the Saffir–Simpson scale.
15:00 UTC at  the IMD upgrades Gaja to a very severe cyclonic storm.
18:00 UTC at  the IMD estimates Gaja to have peaked in intensity with maximum 3-minute sustained winds of 130 km/h (80 mph) and a minimum central pressure of 976 hPa (mbar; 28.82 inHg).
18:00 UTC at  the JTWC estimates Gaja to have peaked in intensity with maximum 1-minute sustained winds of 150 km/h (90 mph).
between 19:00 and 21:00 UTC at  Gaja makes landfall between Nagapattinam and Vedaranyam.
November 16
00:00 UTC at  the IMD downgrades Gaja to a severe cyclonic storm.
03:00 UTC at  the IMD downgrades Gaja to a cyclonic storm.
06:00 UTC at  the IMD downgrades Gaja to a deep depression.
06:00 UTC at  the JTWC downgrades Gaja to a tropical storm.
12:00 UTC at  the IMD downgrades Gaja to a depression.
November 17
00:00 UTC at  the IMD upgrades Gaja to a deep depression.
November 18
00:00 UTC at  the JTWC downgrades Gaja to a tropical depression.
12:00 UTC at  the JTWC downgrades Gaja to a disturbance.
November 19
06:00 UTC at  the IMD downgrades Gaja to a depression.
18:00 UTC the IMD downgrades Gaja to a well-marked low.

December
December 13
00:00 UTC at  the IMD upgrades a well-marked low in the Bay of Bengal to a depression.
12:00 UTC at  the JTWC upgrades the system to a tropical depression, assigning it the designation 07B.
18:00 UTC at  the IMD upgrades 07B to a deep depression.
December 15
06:00 UTC at  the JTWC upgrades 07B to a tropical storm.
12:00 UTC at  the IMD upgrades 07B to a cyclonic storm, assigning it the name Phethai.
December 16
09:00 UTC at  the IMD upgrades Phethai to a severe cyclonic storm.
12:00 UTC at  the IMD estimates Phethai to have peaked in intensity with maximum 3-minute sustained winds of 100 km/h (65 mph) and a minimum central pressure of 992 hPa (mbar; 29.29 inHg).
12:00 UTC at  the JTWC estimates Phethai to have peaked in intensity with maximum 1-minute sustained winds of 100 km/h (65 mph).
December 17
03:00 UTC at  the IMD downgrades Phethai to a cyclonic storm.
between 08:00 and 09:00 UTC at  Phethai makes landfall south of Yanam.
12:00 UTC at  the IMD downgrades Phethai to a deep depression.
12:00 UTC at  the JTWC downgrades Phethai to a tropical depression.
between 14:00 and 15:00 UTC Phethai makes landfall near Tuni.
18:00 UTC at  the IMD downgrades Phethai to a depression.
December 18
00:00 UTC the IMD downgrades Phethai to a well-marked low.

See also
Timeline of the 2018 Atlantic hurricane season
Timeline of the 2018 Pacific hurricane season
Timeline of the 2018 Pacific typhoon season

References

North Indian Ocean meteorological timelines
2018 North Indian Ocean cyclone season